Labdia auchmerodes is a moth in the family Cosmopterigidae. It is found in Australia, where it has been recorded from Tasmania.

References

External links
Natural History Museum Lepidoptera generic names catalog

Labdia 
Moths described in 1939